The Burkholderiales are an order of Pseudomonadota. Like all Pseudomonadota, they are Gram-negative. They include several pathogenic bacteria, including species of Burkholderia, Bordetella, and Ralstonia. They also include Oxalobacter and related genera, which are unusual in using oxalic acid as their source of carbon. Other well-studied genera include Alcaligenes, Cupriavidus, Achromobacter, Comamonas, Delftia, Massilia, Duganella, Janthinobacterium, Polynucleobacter (important freshwater bacterioplankton), non-pathogenic Paraburkholderia, Caballeronia, Polaromonas, Thiomonas, Collimonas, Hydrogenophaga, Sphaerotilus, Variovorax, Acidovorax, Rubrivivax and Rhodoferax (both members of the photosynthetic purple nonsulfur bacteria), and Herbaspirillum (capable of nitrogen-fixation).

References

External links

 Burkholderiales J.P. Euzéby: List of Prokaryotic names with Standing in Nomenclature

 
Betaproteobacteria